The 2021–22 Notre Dame Fighting Irish men's basketball team represented the University of Notre Dame during the 2021–22 NCAA Division I men's basketball season. The Fighting Irish were led by 22nd-year head coach Mike Brey and played their home games at the Edmund P. Joyce Center in South Bend, Indiana as ninth-year members of the Atlantic Coast Conference. They finished the season 24–11, 15–5 in ACC Play to finish a tie for second place. As the No. 2 seed, they lost in the quarterfinals of the ACC tournament to Virginia Tech. They received an at-large bid to the NCAA tournament as the No. 11 seed in the West Region, where they defeated Rutgers in the First Four and then upset Alabama to advance to the Second Round where they lost to Texas Tech.

Previous season
In a season limited due to the ongoing COVID-19 pandemic, the Fighting Irish finished the 2020–21 season 11–15, 7–11 in ACC play to finish in 11th place. In the ACC tournament they defeated Wake Forest before losing to North Carolina in the second round.

Offseason

Departures

Incoming transfers

Recruiting classes

2021 recruiting class

2022 recruiting class

Roster

Schedule and results

|-
!colspan=12 style=| Exhibition

|-
!colspan=12 style=| Regular season

|-
!colspan=12 style=| ACC Tournament

|-
!colspan=9 style=|NCAA tournament

Source

Rankings

*AP does not release post-NCAA Tournament rankings

References

Notre Dame Fighting Irish men's basketball seasons
Notre Dame
Notre Dame Fighting Irish men's basketball
Notre Dame